Pauline Sillett (born 22 April 1949 in Bury, Greater Manchester) is a retired British freestyle swimmer.

Swimming career
Sillett participated in the 1964 Summer Olympics. She also won two bronze medals at the 1966 European Aquatics Championships.

She won the 1966 British Championship in 100 metres freestyle.

References

External links

1949 births
Living people
British female swimmers
Swimmers at the 1964 Summer Olympics
British female freestyle swimmers
Olympic swimmers of Great Britain
European Aquatics Championships medalists in swimming
Sportspeople from Bury, Greater Manchester
Commonwealth Games medallists in swimming
Commonwealth Games gold medallists for England
Commonwealth Games bronze medallists for England
Swimmers at the 1966 British Empire and Commonwealth Games
20th-century British women
21st-century British women
Medallists at the 1966 British Empire and Commonwealth Games